Dahil May Isang Ikaw (International title: Destined Hearts / ) is a Philippine primetime drama series that aired on ABS-CBN starring Kristine Hermosa, Jericho Rosales, Lorna Tolentino, Gabby Concepcion, John Estrada, Chin Chin Gutierrez, Karylle and Sid Lucero. The show marks the reunion of young actors Kristine Hermosa and Jericho Rosales as a love team after five years, since their previous series, Sana'y Wala Nang Wakas. It is a comeback primetime series of award-winning actress Lorna Tolentino on ABS-CBN after eight years. The first teaser was released on July 22, 2009 after TV Patrol which shows viewers the powerhouse cast and actors portrayal in the series. It premiered on ABS-CBN from August 24, 2009 to January 15, 2010, replacing Only You and was replaced by Kung Tayo'y Magkakalayo.

According to ABS-CBN International Sales and Distribution, the series will soon air in Malaysia and other Asian countries with the English title of Destined Hearts. Dahil May Isang Ikaw is nominated in 2010 International Emmy Awards in the Telenovela category and Sid Lucero for Best Performance by an Actor for his role as Red Ramirez. The show was nominated as best foreign drama series in the Emmy Awards.

Premiere and concept
The show premiered on August 24, 2009 at 09:30 PM (PST) timeslot. It was then adjusted to 08:45 PM (PST) timeslot last December 14, 2009, replacing the timeslot of Lovers In Paris. Dahil May Isang Ikaw tells the tale of two families whose fates intertwine with one another, creating a rather complicated love story between two brothers and two sisters.

Story and development
Tessa Ramirez (Lorna Tolentino) is a great and well-respected lawyer who has won every case she took, particularly child abuse cases. However, the agony in searching for her lost daughter is her greatest fight. Before attaining success in life, she was once a faithful and loving partner of Jaime Alferos (Gabby Concepcion) during college in 1980. Jaime had promised Tessa that they will get married once he comes back from a six-month stay in the States for academics. One day, Jaime's mother (Alicia Alonso) told Tessa that Jaime is committed to an affair with another lady. Tessa called Jaime, but the phone call was received by Patricia Aragon (Chin-Chin Gutierrez), who confirmed the relationship. Tessa was pregnant at that time. Daniel Ramirez (John Estrada) is a friend who secretly loves her. He will do anything that will please Tessa and, in fact, he stands as husband and father of the child.

In an unexpected situation, Tessa's daughter Melissa was kidnapped by a syndicate whose motives is to raise babies to be laborers. Daniel was taking baby Melissa to see her pediatrician, when he was suddenly held at gunpoint by a man demanding he hand over the baby or be killed. Tessa greatly blamed Daniel when she discovered he lost her daughter.

In an effort to make things up to Tessa, Daniel promises to put her through law school, which is her most cherished dream. To support her, he turns to a life of crime. One day while robbing a bank, his heist partner is killed after shooting a bank customer during a scuffle. The customer turns out to be a brother of a government official and, because his killer is already dead, Daniel is detained for his murder.

Ella (Mika dela Cruz, later to be Kristine Hermosa) is a girl who has simple dream, to be loved by her mother. She tried to make her dream come true by dropping a bended one peso coin to the river; it was caught by a sailing vessel instead. She saw a boy, Miguel (Paul Salas, later to be Jericho Rosales) who secretly boarded that ship. She asks him to drop the coin to the water but young Miguel didn't hear it clearly. Both of them were caught, Miguel by a fisherman forcibly asking him to get down immediately and Ella by her mother while punishing her because of stealing the peso.

Here comes young Pip (Nash Aguas, later to be Sid Lucero) who stole a lady's handbag due to starvation. Pip has been influenced by his biological father before. Young Miguel advised his half brother (not by blood) not to do it anymore.

As all struggle for their dreams' fate leads Miguel to Tessa after overhearing Ella's dream about being with her idol who is Tessa the dedicated lawyer Miguel heard in Ella's stories. Tessa decides to provide help to Miguel on getting Pip out of jail. Not only does she do this but finds it in her heart that she is close to young Miguel as if he were her child. In prison meanwhile Pip's life is hardened. Daniel decides to take in Pip so he doesn't want to be hardened by the inmates.

Pip seems to be open to Daniel, and Pip is raised with Daniel being his father figure. As Pip leaves early, Tessa decides to take in the two boys to be her own. On the other hand, Jaime takes in little Ella. Patricia and her daughter little Denise (later on played by Karylle) dislike Angela, and they even make it a point to hurt Ella. Ella and Denise later on become friends. Jaime adopts Ella, but Patricia has a constant dislike to her. As Ella grows into a beautiful young woman, she becomes a successful lawyer — making it her ultimate goal to work with her idol, Tessa, and become close to her in general. She becomes ready for her next encounter with her long-lost love Miguel as the two become lawyers who unexpectedly are in the top league: Miguel is No. 1 while Ella is No. 2 in the board exams. Ella is unaware when she meets Tessa as she decides to apply for the law firm. Tessa gives her a big case after Ella initially tries to get hold of Tessa. When Tessa finds out about her last name the bell rings on her behalf and feels mortified yet shocked that her father is Jaime Alferos. Ella is dedicated on that big case.

As Daniel gets out of prison, he goes back to doing his evil deeds and so does Patricia, as both of them are scared to lose Jaime and Tessa. The predicament also goes for Denise and Pip, who is now called Alfred or "Red". They both are ready to pursue against all odds in exchange for their love.

All are struggling as the latter comes to the point that the two families are in a feud. A family torn between love, deception, and all odds.

Cast and characters

Main cast
 Kristine Hermosa as Angela "Ella" Alferos-Ramirez
 Jericho Rosales as Miguel Ramirez
 Lorna Tolentino as Tessa Ramirez
 Gabby Concepcion as Jaime Alferos
 John Estrada as Daniel Ramirez
 Chin-Chin Gutierrez as Patricia Aragon-Alferos
 Karylle as Denise Mae Alferos
 Sid Lucero as Alfred "Red" Ramirez

Supporting cast
 Lauren Young as Rachel
 Arron Villaflor as Marco Aragon
 Chinggoy Alonzo as Don Fernando Aragon
 Alicia Alonzo as Donya Victoria Alferos
 Christian Vasquez as Ed Aragon
 Angel Jacob  as Jill Aragon
 Maricar de Mesa as Atty. Juliana Serrano
 Kitkat as Stephanie "Stef" Miranda
 Peewee O'Hara as Yaya Pining
 Minnie Aguilar as Vanessa Javier
 Kathleen Hermosa as Charlie Sibal
 EJ Jallorina as Ploniong
 Ina Feleo as Nina
 Irene Pheobe Arevalo as Farrah
 Railey Valeroso as Paul Javier
 Josh Ivan Morales as Mario
 Cynthia Reyes as Nadia
 Val Iglesias as Wilbert
 Efren Reyes, Jr. as Guido
 Tanya Gomez as Stella Cleofas Remulla
 Archie Adamos as Cong. Eduardo Javier
 Jong Cuenco as Nikos

Guest cast
 Mika Dela Cruz as Young Ella
 Paul Salas as Young Miguel
 Angel Sy as Young Denise
 Nash Aguas as Young Red/Pip
 Xyriel Manabat as Nini
 Chacha Cañete as Bulilit
 Lauren Novero as Jess Garcia
 Eda Nolan as Mara Cortez
 Erika Padilla as Janelle Paez
 Zeppi Borromeo as Efren Villegas
 Joey Paras as Manolo Meloto
 Joem Bascon as Ryan Fernandez
 Cherry Lou as Patty Ancheta
 Leandro Baldemor as Mayong Ancheta
 Joyce So as Mika Tantingco
 Jazz Angela Cabaccang as Irene
 Amy Nobleza as Melissa "Kikay" dela Cruz
 Amante Pulido as Ricardo "Kadyo" dela Cruz
 Edwin Pamanian as Rafael Acuyong
 Buddy Palad as Ernesto Trinidad

Production staff
Head writer: Arah Jell Badayos
Writers: Rose Colindres, Mark Duane Angos, Jerome Co, Amanda Beltran
Creative director: Ricky Lee
Creative consultant: Badong Royales

Awards

24th PMPC Star Awards for Television 

|-
| align="center"| 2010 || Dahil May Isang Ikaw || Best Primetime TV Series || 
|-
| align="center"| 2010 || Lorna TolentinoChin-Chin Gutierrez || Best Actress || 
|-
| align="center"| 2010 || John EstradaSid LuceroJericho Rosales || Best Actor || 
|-

34th Annual Guillermo Mendoza Awards

|-
| align="center"| 2010 || Dahil May Isang Ikaw || Most Well Liked Primetime Television Series || 
|-
| align="center"| 2010 || Dahil May Isang Ikaw || Favorite Television Series Couple || 
|-

International Emmy Award 2010

|-
| align="center"| 2010 || Dahil May Isang Ikaw|| Best Drama Series || 
|-
| align="center"| 2010 || Sid Lucero || Best Actor || 
|-

ASAP Pop Viewers Choice Awards 2010

|-
| align="center"| 2010 || Dahil May Isang Ikaw || POP TV Show of The Year || 
|-

2011 New York Festivals TV & Film Award

|-
| align="center"| 2011 || Dahil May Isang Ikaw || Best Telenovela || Finalist
|-

International Broadcast

References

See also
 List of shows previously aired by ABS-CBN

ABS-CBN drama series
2009 Philippine television series debuts
2010 Philippine television series endings
Television series by Star Creatives
Philippine legal television series
Philippine romance television series
Filipino-language television shows
Television shows set in the Philippines